Orthezia is a genus of true bugs belonging to the family Ortheziidae.

The species of this genus are found in Eurasia and Northern America.

Species:
 Orthezia ambrosicola Morrison, 1952 
 Orthezia annae Cockerell, 1893

References

Ortheziidae